Yukino Inamura (born 19 February 2003) is a Japanese professional footballer who plays as a midfielder for WE League club AC Nagano Parceiro Ladies.

Club career 
Inamura made her WE League debut on 12 September 2021.

References 

Living people
2003 births
Women's association football midfielders
WE League players
Japanese women's footballers
Association football people from Nagano Prefecture
AC Nagano Parceiro Ladies players